Ebba Louise Nanny Cedercreutz (née Lagerborg; March 19, 1866, in Cannes – December 8, 1950, in Helsinki) was a Finnish author and physicist. She authored her doctoral dissertation on rock salt at the University of Stockholm in 1888, before studying mathematics at the Sorbonne. Between 1914 and 1948, she wrote thirteen books in Swedish; nine under her own name, one under the pseudonym Ala and three under the male name Bengt Ivarson.

References 

1866 births
1950 deaths
Finnish writers
Finnish physicists
Finnish women writers
Stockholm University alumni
20th-century pseudonymous writers
Pseudonymous women writers